Hari Gurung (born 18 February 1990) is a Bhutanese footballer. He made his first appearance for the Bhutan national football team in 2009. He is popularly known as the Great Wall of Bhutan.

References

Bhutan international footballers
Bhutanese footballers
Yeedzin F.C. players
1992 births
Living people
People from Thimphu
Association football goalkeepers
Bhutanese people of Nepalese descent
Gurung people